Deirdre Sullivan is an Irish children's writer and poet.

Early life and education

Sullivan was born in Galway. Sullivan went to college and became a teacher working with autistic children. She now lives in Ranelagh in Dublin. Sullivan took a course with Siobhán Parkinson who taught creative writing at Colaiste Mhuire, Marino, Dublin. Her lecturer commissioned her to write her first book. Several of her books have been shortlisted for awards and Tangleweed and Brine won the 28th CBI Book of the Year Awards, written with illustrator Karen Vaughan. Sullivan's first play Wake debuted in Galway in February 2019.

In 2021, her story, "Little Lives" won 'Short Story of the Year' at the Irish Book Awards.

Bibliography
 Prim Improper, Little Island, 2010
 The Nightmare Club 1: Help! My Brother is a Zombie!, Little Island, 2010
 The Nightmare Club 2: Guinea Pig Killer, Little Island, 2010
 The Nightmare Club 3: The Hatching, Little Island 2012
 Seeing Red, Watching My Hands at Work: A festschrift for Adrian Frazier, Salmon Poetry 2013
 Improper Order, Little Island, 2013
 Primperfect, Little Island, 2014
 Needlework, Little Island, 2016
 Tangleweed and Brine, Little Island, 2017
 Perfectly Preventable Deaths, Hot Key, 2019
 Savage Her Reply, Little Island, 2020
 I Want To Know That I will Be Okay, Banshee Press, 2021
 Precious Catastrophe (Perfectly Preventable Deaths 2), Hot Key, 2021

References and sources

People from Galway (city)
Year of birth missing (living people)
21st-century Irish women writers
Irish children's writers
Irish women children's writers
Living people